William Forrest may refer to:

William Forrest (actor) (1902–1989), American actor
William Forrest (poet) (fl. 1581), English priest and poet
William Forrest (Australian politician) (1835–1903), Australian pastoralist, businessman and politician
William Duff Forrest (1874–1939), politician in Canada
William Charles Forrest (1819–1902), officer in the British Army
Bill Forrest (1908–1965), football manager

See also